The Paris Road Bridge is the name of the bridge carrying Louisiana Highway 47 across the Mississippi River Gulf Outlet between St. Bernard Parish and New Orleans East in Louisiana, United States. It is also known as the Green Bridge. The name "Green Bridge" came from it originally being painted green. It was repainted brown in 1980, and recently repainted grey, but locals continue to call it "the Green Bridge". 

The bridge was built by the Army Corps of Engineers and opened to traffic on July 21, 1967 with the bridge being completed on November 14 of that year.

Interstate 510 ends just north of the bridge. Both ends of the bridge are in Orleans Parish, but Chalmette is a short distance south of the bridge, which provides the most important road link for St. Bernard Parish, and is one of only four routes into the parish, the others being Judge Perez Drive, the Chalmette Ferry, and the St. Bernard Highway.

References

Bridges in New Orleans
Road bridges in Louisiana
Steel bridges in the United States
Through arch bridges in the United States
Pontoon bridges in the United States
1967 establishments in Louisiana
Bridges completed in 1967